Jamie Haskell (née Johnson; born July 18, 1980) is an American curler. Haskell was born in Bemidji, Minnesota. She was a member of the United States women's curling team at the 2006 Winter Olympics and is the older sister of skip Cassandra Potter.

Career
Haskell usually plays third on her sister's team, and together they have won the silver medal at the 2005 World Championships, the championship at the United States Olympic Trials in February 2005, and the gold medal at the 2002 World Junior Championships.

As a junior curler Haskell competed at the United States Junior Championships six times, earning a medal every time. She finally achieved the gold medal her last year, 2002, playing on her sister's team. As US Junior Champion Haskell represented the United States at the 2002 World Junior Championships where they won the gold medal.

In 2002 Haskell also made her debut appearance at the United States Women's Championship, a championship she would return to 11 more times in the next 12 years. At her 12 appearances at the US Championship she won five medals, gold in 2005 (which was also the Olympic Trials), silver in 2007 and 2012, and bronze in 2011 and 2014.

Winning the US Championship in 2005 earned Haskell a spot at the 2005 World Championship as well as the 2006 Winter Olympics in Turin. Team USA earned the silver medal at World's, losing in the final to Team Sweden, skipped by Anette Norberg. Coming off of the successful World Championship, Haskell and her teammates' trip to the Winter Olympics did not go as well, as the team finished second-to-last with just 2 wins. The team was the youngest ever to represent the United States in curling at the elite level, with an average age of 22.

Haskell, with her husband Nate Haskell, won the first United States Mixed Doubles Championship in 2008. This earned them a spot at the first World Mixed Doubles Championship, held in Vierumäki, Finland. At World's they failed to make the playoffs, finishing the round robin with a record of 3-4. Haskell and her husband returned to the US Mixed Doubles Championship in 2009 and made it to the final, only to lose to Brady and Cristin Clark, whom they had defeated in the semifinals the previous year.

Personal life
The Johnson sisters were born into a curling family, their grandparents and great-grandparents were curlers and their parents, Tim and Liz Johnson, have won the U.S. National Mixed Curling title four times.

Like her sister, Haskell studied Design Technology at Bemidji State University, but her emphasis was in exhibit design while Cassie specialized in graphic design. Haskell finished her degree in 2005.

Jamie is married to Nate Haskell.

Teams

Women's

Mixed doubles

References

External links

1980 births
Living people
People from Bemidji, Minnesota
Olympic curlers of the United States
Curlers at the 2006 Winter Olympics
American female curlers
American curling champions
21st-century American women